Raja Rani Badsha is a 1998 Bengali film directed by Haranath Chakraborty and produced under the banner of Lakshmi Chitram.The film has been music composed by Babul Bose.

Plot
Rani, a little girl, escapes her evil uncle when he tries to kill her family. Later, she meets Joy and Sundari who help her avenge her parents' death but she is shocked when she sees her lookalike.

Cast
 Shakil Khan
 Satabdi Roy
 Santu Mukhopadhyay
 Samit Bhanja
 Nimu Bhowmik
 Ahmed Sarif
 MONA DUTTA
 Gita Dey

References

External links
 
 Raja Rani Badsha on Gomolo

Bengali-language Bangladeshi films
1998 films
Bengali-language Indian films
1990s Bengali-language films
Films scored by Babul Bose
Films directed by Haranath Chakraborty